Associazione Sportiva Dilettantistica Calcio Pomigliano is an Italian association football club located in Pomigliano d'Arco, Campania. It currently plays in Serie D.

History

Gruppo Sportivo Pomigliano 
The club was founded in 1920 as Gruppo Sportivo Pomigliano.

After several years in the regional championships in 1947 comes the first historic promotion to Serie C (under the name of Juve Alfa Pomigliano, enactment of working men's club soccer establishments in Alfa Romeo city), finished in ninth place but the structural reform of the championships send them in the Promozione. Returned in Serie C the following year, but relegated immediately.

After several years between the regional top flight and Serie D, due to various economic hardships that have arisen from the late eighties, the company finally disappeared in 1992.

From Followers Pomigliano to A.S.D.C. Pomigliano 
The club was refounded in 1995 as Followers Pomigliano. Restarting from Terza Categoria, Pomigliano Calcio returned to Serie D in 2002, 15 years after the last inter-regional tournament played.

In the summer 2005 the club was renamed with the current name.

In the 2010–11 and 2011–12 seasons the club gained access to the promotion play-off for Lega Pro Seconda Divisione, but was eventually eliminated both times.

In the 2012–13 season, it plays still in Serie D for the eleventh consecutive championship.

Colors and badge 
The official color of the club is garnet.

Honors 
 Coppa Italia Serie D
 Champions: 2013–14

External links 
 

 
Football clubs in Italy
Association football clubs established in 1920
Football clubs in Campania
1920 establishments in Italy